was a scholar of Japanese literature.

Biography 
He was born in the Nihonbashi Ward of Tokyo City (modern-day Chūō Ward, Tokyo).

He became a lecturer as Kokugakuin University in 1926. He is known for his research on the Kojiki and the Man'yōshū, and in 1950 was awarded the Japan Academy Prize for his work on the Man'yōshū.

Reference list 

1886 births
1958 deaths
Japanese literature academics